Robin Ward may refer to:
Robin Ward (priest) (born 1966), Principal of St Stephen's House, Oxford
Robin Ward (singer) (born 1941), session vocalist in the mid-20th Century
Robin Ward (television personality) (born 1944), Canadian and American television personality